Ziemann is a German surname. Notable people with the surname include:

Benjamin Ziemann (born 1964), German historian
Chris Ziemann (born 1976), American football player
George Patrick Ziemann (1941–2009), American bishop
Sonja Ziemann (born 1926), German actress

See also
Zieman

German-language surnames